Kwabena Ohemeng-Tinyase is a Ghanaian politician and member of the Seventh Parliament of the Fourth Republic of Ghana representing the Kade Constituency in the Eastern Region on the ticket of the New Patriotic Party.

Early life and education 
Ohemeng-Tinyase was born on 6 April 1962 at Kade in the Eastern Region of Ghana. He earned his bachelor of Arts degree in Economics and Political Science from the University of Ghana in 1978. In 2004, he obtained his certificate in Charted Accountancy from Institute of Chartered Accountants Ghana, and a master's degree in Business Administration from Warwick University.

References

Ghanaian MPs 2017–2021
1952 births
Living people
New Patriotic Party politicians